The Central Policy Research Office is an institution of the Central Committee of the Chinese Communist Party responsible for providing policy recommendations and insights to matters of governance, spanning political, social, and economic realms. It is responsible for drafting the ideology and theories of the Chinese Communist Party, as well as various policy pronouncements at major congresses or plenums.

History
This office was founded in 1981, following the Cultural Revolution. Initially it was an office under the Secretariat of the Chinese Communist Party.  Deng Liqun served as its first director.  In 1987, after the ouster of reformer Hu Yaobang as General Secretary of the party and also as a result of Deng Liqun being politically sidelined, the office was re-organized and renamed as the Central Office for Political Structure Reform, headed by Bao Tong, at the time the main secretary to then-party leader Zhao Ziyang. Bao was later purged along with his boss, when Zhao fell out of favour after the 1989 Tiananmen Square protests. In that year, the Political Reform Office was merged with the "Central Rural Research Office", after which it took on its current name.

The office was a major force behind crafting the ideologies of three successive administrations: the "Three Represents" of Jiang Zemin, the Scientific Development Concept of Hu Jintao, and the Chinese Dream of Xi Jinping. Wang Huning, who took charge of the office in 2002, is seen as one of the main advisors of Xi Jinping.

Administratively, the office is at the same level as a ministry of state. Its former head Wang Huning, has been a member of the Politburo of the Chinese Communist Party since 2012, and prior to that, a member of the Secretariat.  This accorded Wang a "deputy national leader" rank.  Additionally, beginning in 2013, the General Office of the Central Leading Group for Comprehensively Deepening Reforms is located at this office and is headed by Wang Huning.

Responsibilities
The office is tasked with drafting the work reports to the party congresses and major party conferences, as well as drafting and revising "major documents of the party centre" and "some major speeches of central leaders." It also provides insights and research for party ideology and theories, as well as the feasibility of major policy initiatives.  it is also to analyze and collect data on the state of the economy and send related recommendations to the party leadership.

The office is composed of several departments, each overseeing politics, economics, "party-building", philosophy and history, culture, international affairs, general affairs, and rural affairs. In 2007, a department focused on "social affairs" was created.

List of directors 
 Deng Liqun, as director of the Research Office of the Secretariat (1981 – 1987)
 Bao Tong, as director of the Office for Political Structure Reform (1987 – 1989)
 Wang Weicheng (1989 – 1997)
 Teng Wensheng (1997 – 2002)
 Wang Huning (2002 – 2020)
 Jiang Jinquan (2020 – present)

References 

Institutions of the Central Committee of the Chinese Communist Party